Mavoglurant (developmental code name AFQ-056) is an experimental drug candidate for the treatment of fragile X syndrome and other conditions which has been discontinued.  It exerts its effect as an antagonist of the metabotropic glutamate receptor 5 (mGluR5).

Mavoglurant was under development by Novartis and reached phase II and phase III clinical trials. Phase IIb/III dose finding and evaluation trials for fragile X-syndrome were discontinued by the end of 2014. Otherwise, it would have been the first drug to treat the underlying disorder instead of the symptoms of fragile X syndrome. Mavoglurant was also in phase II clinical trials for Levodopa-induced dyskinesia. In 2007, Norvartis had conducted a clinical study to assess its ability of reducing cigarette smoking, but no results had been published up till now. Novartis was conducting a clinical trial with this drug on obsessive–compulsive disorder.

Novartis discontinued development of mavoglurant for fragile X syndrome in April 2014 following disappointing trial results. Development was discontinued for other indications by 2017.

See also
 Basimglurant

References

Abandoned drugs
Tertiary alcohols
Alkyne derivatives
Carbamates
Methyl esters
MGlu5 receptor antagonists